A list of windmills in South Africa.

Locations

Western Cape

Other locations

Notes

Known building dates are in bold text. Non-bold text denotes first known date. Dates in "Notes" column is last known date the mill was in existence unless otherwise stated. One of the Salt River windmills was standing in 1844, and one of them was standing c. 1896.

References

The reference for all entries is  unless otherwise stated.

External links
Windmill World webpage on South Africa's windmills

South Africa
 
Win
Windmills